The Greater Middlesex Conference is an athletic conference comprising 34 public and private high schools located in the greater Middlesex County, New Jersey area. The league operates under the supervision of the New Jersey State Interscholastic Athletic Association.
There are both competitions in Middle and High school levels.

Gold Division

Blue Division

White Division

Red Division

East Brunswick High School serves Grades 10–12. Freshmen are housed at Churchill Junior High School, along with the 8th graders.

League sports
The following is a list of the sports that the Greater Middlesex Conference offers. Some sports do not have a team from every school, while other sports have teams from all 33 member schools. Each bullet is an individual team (as in one team for girls and one team for boys — not a combined unisex team). For example, although the boys and girls track teams from a single school usually practice together and have meets at the same time, there are separate events at their meets for boys and for girls, and therefore, the teams are scored and compete separately.

Fall sports 
Cross Country
Field Hockey
Football
Soccer
Cheerleading
Marching Band
Tennis (Girls)
Volleyball (G)

Winter sports 
Basketball
Bowling
Ice Hockey
Swimming
Winter Track (and field)
Wrestling
Sailing

Spring sports 
Baseball
Golf
Lacrosse
Softball
Tennis (Boys)
Track & Field
Volleyball (B)

External links
Greater Middlesex Conference- Official Website
Greater Middlesex Conference- Schedules
Greater Middlesex Conference - Cross Country & Track and Field

Middlesex County, New Jersey
New Jersey high school athletic conferences